Harimau Muda B was the club name for the former Malaysia Under-21 National Football Team and was managed by the Football Association of Malaysia. The national team played as a club under the name Harimau Muda B which took part in Malaysia Premier League from the 2007–08 season and also FA Cup Malaysia. In 2015, Harimau Muda once again became a single team composed of former Harimau Muda A & B players.

Harimau Muda B last competed in Singapore's 2014 S. League. The team was aimed at developing Malaysian youth players and does not recruit any foreign nationals in its squad. On 25 November 2015,it was confirmed that the Harimau Muda has disbanded by FAM which means all the player from Harimau Muda A,Harimau Muda B and Harimau Muda C will be returned to their own state.

The name "Harimau Muda" means "Young Tigers" in English.

History 

On 19 October 2007 FAM decided to include Malaysia U-21 as one of the team in Malaysia Premier League 2007-08 and will be known as Harimau Muda (Young Tigers). Due to international duties, The Malaysia national U-21 team were needed to participate in the 2010 AFC U-19 Championship qualification. But they also needed to participate in the Premier League Malaysia and the Malaysia FA Cup 2009.

In July 2009, The Harimau Muda were split into 2 teams. Harimau Muda A and Harimau Muda B. The Harimau Muda A were sent to Zibo, China to participate in the 2010 AFC U-19 Championship qualification while Harimau Muda B participated in Malaysia Premier League and the FA Cup.

During the 2010 season, Harimau Muda A went to a training camp in Zlaté Moravce, Slovakia for 8 months while Harimau Muda B participated in the 2010 Malaysia Premier League.

On the 2011 season, Harimau Muda A joined the 2011 Super League Malaysia replacing KL PLUS FC and Harimau Muda B continued to play in the 2011 Malaysia Premier League. Harimau Muda A finished 5th while Harimau Muda B played their worst season being in the bottom 3. However, they managed to avoid relegation and will continue to play in the Malaysia Premier League.

For the 2012 season, Harimau Muda A swapped places with Singapore LIONSXII of Singapore, which is Singapore's national under-23 team. Harimau Muda B continue to participate in the 2012 Malaysia Premier League. Harimau Muda A did not enter the 2012 Singapore Cup to concentrate for 2013 AFC U-22 Asian Cup qualification thus Harimau Muda B took their slot as a replacement.

In 2013, The Football Association of Malaysia agreed to replace Harimau Muda A with Harimau Muda B in the 2013 S.League campaign. Instead, Harimau Muda A undergo an 8 month long training in central Europe and mainly based at Zlaté Moravce, Slovakia to prepare to defend their title in the 2013 Southeast Asian Games. Harimau Muda B have used under-20 players for the S. League with no foreign players and based in the Pasir Gudang Stadium, replacing Yishun Stadium as their previous home stadium.

In addition, Harimau Muda C was formed to provide a bigger pool of players and become a feeder team for Harimau Muda B, as Harimau Muda B did to Harimau Muda A. Harimau Muda C made their debut in the 3rd Division of Malaysian football, the FAM League and fielded under-18 aged players.

In 2015, Youth and Sports Minister Khairy Jamaluddin, former FAM's Deputy President has stated that the Football Association of Malaysia (FAM) must disband the Harimau Muda system, stating the Harimau Muda system is no longer relevant, it was not planned for the long term, and the state football associations should take the responsibility to groom potential players. The new Harimau Muda participated and won the 2015 Bangabandhu Cup, their first international tournament.

Domestic records

Honours 
Malaysia
 Malaysia Premier League: 2009

Singapore
 Singapore League Cup Plate Tournament: 2013

International records

AFF Youth Championship Record

Hassanal Bolkiah Trophy record 

 Beginning from the 2012 edition, Malaysia is using U-21 players.

Nations Cup

See also 
 Malaysia national football team
 Malaysia women's national football team
 Malaysia national under-23 football team
 Harimau Muda (football team)
 Harimau Muda C
 Malaysia Pahang Sports School
 Malaysia XI
 Malaysia national futsal team

References

External links 
 Football Association of Malaysia
 Bukit Jalil Sports School 
 Tunku Mahkota Ismail Sports School 

Defunct football clubs in Malaysia
Malaysia national football team
Association football clubs established in 2009
Singapore Premier League clubs